Roger Corbett is an Australian businessman.

Roger Corbett may also refer to:
Roger B. Corbett, American academic and college administrator
Roger Corbett (musician) of The Bushwackers

See also
Roger Corbet (disambiguation)